Blanche Ray Alden (July 5, 1870 – November 14, 1934) was an American pianist and composer, who published under the pseudonym Theodora Dutton. Her short piano piece, Christmas Day Secrets, is the only work in the Suzuki Piano Repertoire attributed to a female composer.

Notes

References

Sources
 Suzuki, Dr. Shinichi. (1995). Suzuki Piano School Volume 1, Revised edition.  Alfred Publishing Company.  
 Ccm :: Alden, Blanche Ray Alden - Dutton, Theodora Dutton at composers-classical-music.com

External links
 
 Scanned copy of letter Blanche Ray Alden wrote to Edvard Grieg in 1894

American women composers
American pianists
American women pianists
1870 births
1934 deaths